West Windsor is a town in Windsor County, Vermont, United States. The population was 1,344 at the 2020 census.
It was known for its Ascutney Mountain Resort, which closed in 2010 and was bought by its citizens in 2015.

Geography

The unincorporated village of Brownsville is one of the few urban areas in the town and  sits at the northwestern base of Mount Ascutney (elevation 3143 ft.).

Demographics

At the 2000 census there were 1,067 people, 456 households, and 327 families in the town.  The population density was 43.2 people per square mile (16.7/km2).  There were 716 housing units at an average density of 29.0 per square mile (11.2/km2).  The racial makeup of the town was 98.31% White, 0.28% African American, 0.28% Native American, 0.19% Asian, and 0.94% from two or more races. Hispanic or Latino of any race were 1.59%.

Of the 456 households 28.9% had children under the age of 18 living with them, 63.4% were married couples living together, 5.5% had a female householder with no husband present, and 28.1% were non-families. 22.8% of households were one person and 7.0% were one person aged 65 or older.  The average household size was 2.34 and the average family size was 2.74.

The age distribution was 21.6% under the age of 18, 5.0% from 18 to 24, 23.1% from 25 to 44, 34.9% from 45 to 64, and 15.6% 65 or older.  The median age was 45 years. For every 100 females, there were 99.4 males.  For every 100 females age 18 and over, there were 99.3 males.

The median household income was $54,792 and the median family income  was $63,456. Males had a median income of $33,309 versus $35,750 for females. The per capita income for the town was $28,360.  About 5.1% of families and 5.6% of the population were below the poverty line, including 7.7% of those under age 18 and 3.1% of those age 65 or over.

According to the NY Times, between 2010 and 2020, the town’s population jumped over 20 percent and median single-family home sale prices more than doubled, to $329,750.

Economy
In 2010 the Ascutney Mountain Resort closed because of scant snow and mismanagement. In 2015, the town bought the failed ski area with the help of nonprofit Trust for Public Land and residents charted a sustainable, volunteer-driven path.

Notable people

 Rollin Amsden, U.S. Marshal for Vermont
 Charles Bronson, Actor, interred at Brownsville Cemetery.

References

External links
 Town of West Windsor official website
 Windsor School District

 
Towns in Vermont
Towns in Windsor County, Vermont